Thornton is an unincorporated community spanning Thornbury Township, Concord Township and Middletown Township in Delaware County, Pennsylvania.

The George W. Hill Correctional Facility, located in the townships of Thornbury and Concord, has a Thornton postal address.

History
In 1750, Thornton was known as Yellow House after the Inn and tavern opened in 1750.
 
The community includes the Thornton Village Historic District, which includes buildings dating from 1750 to 1855.  The District was added to the National Register of Historic Places in 2006.

References

Unincorporated communities in Delaware County, Pennsylvania
Unincorporated communities in Pennsylvania